The Smithville Apothecary is a historic Queen Anne-style building located off Moss Mill Road in Smithville, Atlantic County, New Jersey. It was added to the National Register of Historic Places on June 9, 1978, for its significance in architecture and commerce.

History
The pharmacy was built  by Dr. John Lewis Lane in Manahawkin, Ocean County, New Jersey. The building was sold in 1894 and became the Barnegat Exchange of the telephone company. Next it was used as the local post office, and then as a headquarters for the local Girl Scouts. Finally, it was purchased by the Smithville Inn. The building was then moved to its current location in Historic Smithville, where it is now the Jewelry Box of Smithville.

See also
National Register of Historic Places listings in Atlantic County, New Jersey

References

External links
 
 

National Register of Historic Places in Atlantic County, New Jersey
Galloway Township, New Jersey
New Jersey Register of Historic Places
Relocated buildings and structures in New Jersey
1885 establishments in New Jersey
Retail buildings in New Jersey
Commercial buildings completed in 1885
Queen Anne architecture in New Jersey
Pharmacies on the National Register of Historic Places